Orpecovalva is a Palearctic of moths in the family Autostichidae.

SpeciesOrpecovalva acantha (Gozmány, 1963)Orpecovalva diadema Gozmány, 1977Orpecovalva glaseri Gozmány, 1977Orpecovalva kasyi Gozmány, 1988Orpecovalva mallorcae Gozmány, 1975Orpecovalva obliterata'' (Walsingham, 1905)

References

External links
 Images representing  Orpecovalva at Consortium for the Barcode of Life

 
Symmocinae